Charles Brooke may refer to:
 Charles Brooke (surgeon) (1804–1879), English surgeon and inventor
 Charles Brooke, Rajah of Sarawak (1829–1917), head of state of Sarawak, Borneo
 Charles Brooke (Jesuit) (1777–1852), English Jesuit
 Charles Vyner Brooke (1874–1963), third and last White Rajah of Sarawak

See also
 Charles Brook (disambiguation)
 Charles Brooks (disambiguation)